Stobaera concinna is a species of delphacid planthopper in the family Delphacidae. It is found in the Caribbean, Central America, and North America.

References

Further reading

 
 

Articles created by Qbugbot
Insects described in 1859
Delphacini